Creag Odhar is a rocky mountain peak in the southern Highlands of Scotland, in Perthshire north of Aberfeldy. The name is Gaelic, from creag, meaning "crag" or "peak", and odhar, meaning "gray".

References

Mountains and hills of Perth and Kinross